Crisis: Behind a Presidential Commitment is a 1963 direct cinema documentary film directed by Robert Drew. The film centers on the University of Alabama's "Stand in the Schoolhouse Door" integration crisis of June 1963. Drew and the other filmmakers, including D. A. Pennebaker and Richard Leacock, were given expanded access to key areas, including United States President John F. Kennedy's Oval Office and the homes of United States Attorney General Robert F. Kennedy and Governor George Wallace of Alabama. The film first aired on the American Broadcasting Company (ABC) as an installment of Close-Up! four months after the incident, on October 28, 1963. It was added to the National Film Registry of the Library of Congress on December 28, 2011.

Synopsis
Shot primarily during a two-day period surrounding the University of Alabama integration crisis on June 11, 1963, the film follows President John F. Kennedy, Attorney General Robert F. Kennedy, Governor George Wallace of Alabama, Deputy Attorney General Nicholas Katzenbach, and the students involved, Vivian Malone and James Hood. Since Wallace had promised to personally block the two black students from enrolling in the university, the Kennedy administration discusses how to respond without rousing the crowd, as had happened the year before in Mississippi, or making Wallace a martyr for the segregationist cause. They come up with a way in which they can quickly federalize the Alabama National Guard if the students are turned away so that Malone and Hood can return and enroll later the same day, rather than the next day, which it is hoped will show that the move is justified, but not let Wallace delay the court-mandated integration for more than a few hours.

The plan works. Wallace, after initially standing his ground, steps aside under orders from General Henry V. Graham and the students enter the building. That night, President Kennedy gives a speech about civil rights on national television. Later, a third black student, Dave McGlathery is shown enrolling in the University of Alabama without incident.

Reception
Although opinions on Crisis were sharply divided after the October 1963 broadcast, it is now considered among the landmark films of cinéma vérité, or direct cinema. Peter von Bagh rated it ahead of Drew's earlier work Primary, considering it the most touching and intimate portrait of the Kennedy brothers on film. Fred Kaplan, in a review for The New York Times of the film's 2009 DVD release, wrote that "though we now know the story’s ending — the students were finally let in — the suspense is gripping." He dubbed it "the first movie that Barack Obama should watch in the White House screening room."

In 2011, this film was deemed "culturally, historically, or aesthetically significant" by the United States Library of Congress and selected for preservation in the National Film Registry. The Registry said that Crisis "has proven to be a uniquely revealing complement to written histories of the period, providing viewers the rare opportunity to witness historical events from an insider’s perspective." The Academy Film Archive preserved Crisis in 1999.

See also
 List of American films of 1963
 Cultural depictions of John F. Kennedy
 Civil rights movement in popular culture

References

External links
 
 Crisis: Behind a Presidential Commitment – Drew Associates.

1963 films
1963 documentary films
American documentary films
Black-and-white documentary films
Documentary films about American politics
Documentary films about John F. Kennedy
Documentary films about Robert F. Kennedy
Documentary films about the civil rights movement
United States National Film Registry films
Political history of Alabama
University of Alabama
Films directed by Robert Drew
Films shot in Alabama
African-American history of Alabama
American black-and-white films
Documentary films about Alabama
1960s English-language films
1960s American films